= Lailuma Ahmadi =

Afgan politician

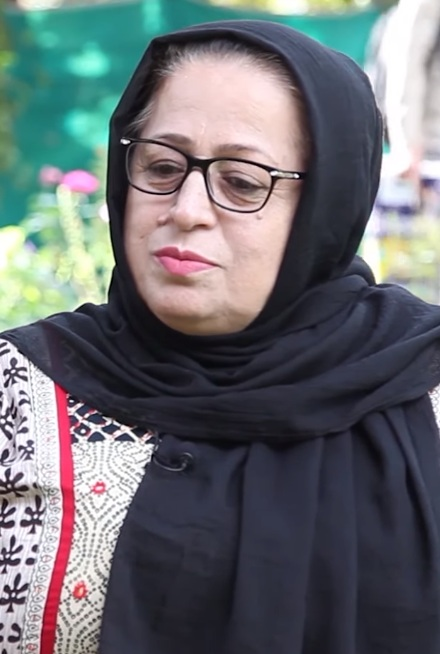
- Born: 1964 (age 60–61); Kabul, Afghanistan

Lailuma Ahmadi (Dari: ليلما احمدی, born 1964) is an Afghan media professional and politician. She was a member of the Afghan Senate before the fall of Kabul.

== Early life ==
She was born in 1964 in Kabul and was raised there in a family originally from the state of Panjshir. She studied media at the Kabul Technical Institute and graduated in 1981, then continued her studies after 2002 until she obtained a Bachelor of Political Science in 2014. Since 1981, she has worked as artistic director, journalist, broadcaster, programmer, director of radio and television programmes, first editor-in-chief of Women's Day magazine, employee of the Presidential Press Office, member of the Afghanistan Council for Peaceful Consultations and member of the traditional Loya Jirga . She was nicknamed "Shaista" (decent) in her media career. She was appointed as a member of the Afghan Senate and worked in the relevant bodies and as the deputy of the Education, Culture, Higher Education and Scientific Research Committee.
